Get in the Car, Loser! is a 2021 indie role-playing video game developed and published by Love Conquers All Games and released on September 21, 2021, for Windows. It follows three lesbian adventurers and an angel as they go on a road trip in order to stop the evil Machine Devil from being resurrected and escape the Divine Order that seeks to capture them. The game has a $10 DLC, Battle on the Big Boardwalk, containing a beach episode and ultimate boss. It received positive reviews from critics, citing the story, visuals, music and battle system.

Development 
The game was the first RPG developed by Christine Love, who had previously developed visual novels. She stated that the different format allowed the game to convey a "sense of place" since movement in a visual novel is inherently menu-driven.

Reception 
Sam Wachter of RPGamer rated the game 4/5 points, calling the battle system "serviceable", but not keyboard-friendly, and noted that it was easier to play with a controller. He also called the difficulty "unbalanced", with some acts being "trivial" while others were incredibly difficult. However, he praised the presentation as "fabulous", saying "a lot of the music absolutely slaps", and stating that the game's visuals had "a lot of punch to them".

Isaiah Colbert of Kotaku called the game "a trip worth taking", saying that the writing was "witty and deep" and the pixel art "evocative". While calling the game's early combat "repetitive", he stated that it "evolved into more challenging exchanges", and said that it was "ultimately pretty approachable".

References 

2021 video games
Freeware games
Indie video games
Role-playing video games
Single-player video games
Video games about cults
Video games about Satanism
Video games developed in Canada
Windows games
Windows-only games
LGBT-related video games